Maslen is a surname. Notable people with the surname include:

Bill Maslen (1916–1974), Australian rules footballer
Dudley Maslen (born 1948), Australian politician
Riz Maslen, English electronic music artist
Scott Maslen (born 1971), English actor and model

See also